Ahmed Muthasim Adnan  (born 9 February 1965) is the Chief Justice of the Maldives from December 8, 2019.

References

Chief justices
1964 births
Living people